The Aiken Training Track, with its banked turns and soft straightaways, was considered one of the best tracks in the country upon its completion in 1941. Notable surrounding buildings include a stable, shed and grandstand. The track and supporting structures, as well as other (non-historic register) structures may be enjoyed and viewed from the quiet roads that border the large district. The Aiken County Training Track, located in Aiken, South Carolina, was listed in the National Register of Historic Places on May 9, 1985.

References

Sports venues completed in 1941
Sports venues in Aiken County, South Carolina
Horse racing venues in South Carolina
National Register of Historic Places in Aiken County, South Carolina
Historic districts on the National Register of Historic Places in South Carolina
Sports venues on the National Register of Historic Places in South Carolina
Buildings and structures in Aiken, South Carolina
1941 establishments in South Carolina